Ignacy Tiegerman (24 February 189331 May 1968), usually seen as Ignace, but also Ignaz, was a Polish pianist and teacher.

He was an exceptional interpreter of the Romantic school (Field, Chopin, Brahms, et al.). He studied with Theodor Leschetizky but his lessons with Leschetizky's assistant Ignaz Friedman were more significant. Tiegerman considered Friedman his mentor, and Friedman deemed him "the greatest talent I ever worked with."

His recordings are highly regarded, despite their not being of studio sound quality in most cases. He was said to be the only rival Vladimir Horowitz ever feared. Due to health reasons, he spent most of his life teaching in Cairo.

His finest pupil was Henri Barda, and he also taught Edward Said, Mario Feninger, Nicolas Constantinidis, and Prince Hassan Aziz Hassan. Hassan called him "a wonder of human realization" and Said later recalled many wonderful late-night conversations with him

References

External links
Biographical Info on Tiegerman
Information on obtaining his recordings

1893 births
1968 deaths
Polish classical pianists
Male classical pianists
20th-century classical pianists
Jewish classical pianists
Polish emigrants to Egypt
20th-century male musicians